Vangede Battery (Danish: Vangede Batteri), located in Vangede, Gentofte Municipality, is a former military structure and current park in the northern suburbs of Copenhagen, Denmark.

History
Vangede Battery was constructed in 1888 as part of Copenhagen's new ring fortification and was to guard the area between Lyngby Fort and  GarderhøjFort. The structure was dug into a hill located just west of the village of Vangede. It was 350 metres long and had a crescent shape with a dry moat located in front of it. It contained a barracks building with four residential rooms for officers and private soldiers as well as a munition magazine. The battery was equipped with two 1+-trunk machine guns and nine 12 cm canons.

The battery was decommissioned along with the rest of the fortifications in 1920. The casemate was later used by a now closed tin recycling plant.

Today
The northern and central part of the area has been converted into a public park by Gentofte Municipality while southern part of the area has been sold off and redeveloped with single-family detached homes. The casemate is now the site of a playground. The northern battery line is well-preserved and can be seen from Horsevej and Stolbergsvej.

References

External links

Fortifications of Copenhagen
Buildings and structures in Gentofte Municipality
Buildings and structures completed in 1888
1888 establishments in Denmark